Crenicichla tesay is a species of cichlid native to South America. It is found in the Río Iguazú basin in Argentina.

References

Casciotta, J. and A. Almirón, 2009. Crenicichla tesay, a new species of cichlid (Perciformes: Labroidei) from the río Iguazú basin in Argentina. Rev. Suisse Zool. 115(4):651-660. 

tesay
Fish of Argentina
Taxa named by Jorge Rafael Casciotta
Taxa named by Adriana Edith Almirón
Fish described in 2009